The general strike of 1960–1961, known popularly in Wallonia as the Strike of the Century (Grève du Siècle), was a major series of strikes in Belgium which began on 14 December 1960 and lasted approximately six weeks. 

The general strike was instigated by the militant trade union, the General Labour Federation of Belgium (Fédération Générale du Travail de Belgique, or FGTB; Algemeen Belgisch Vakverbond, ABVV), against an attempt by the government of Gaston Eyskens to improve the state of Belgium's public finances after the independence of the Belgian Congo by introducing a series of austerity measures known as the Unitary Law (Loi Unique or Eenheidswet). It has been described as "one of the most serious class confrontations in Belgium's social history", which brought out 700,000 workers out on strike. A number of clashes took place between strikers and the police, Gendarmerie, and Belgian Army. In one incident, the Liège-Guillemins railway station was ransacked by strikers on 6 January 1961. Although the strike began across Belgium, it soon lost momentum in Flanders where workers returned to work after a few days. The strike continued in Wallonia, a region largely reliant on heavy industry and already starting to experience deindustrialization, for several weeks. The law was eventually passed on 14 February 1961. Four strikers died.

The strike is considered a key moment for the Walloon Movement and an influence on the formation of Walloon identity. It led to the foundation of a new ideology of Renardism which linked Walloon nationalism with syndicalism. The strike also led to the creation of the pro-federalist Walloon Popular Movement (Mouvement Populaire Wallon, MPW) in 1961 and an increasing polarization between Flemish and Walloons which culminated, from the late 1960s, in the "Linguistic Wars" and, ultimately, in Belgium's gradual transformation into a federal state.

The 1983 film Winter 1960 is based on the strike.  The strike was the subject of the documentary film Lorsque le bateau de Léon M. descendit la Meuse pour la première fois (1979) by the Dardenne brothers.

See also 

 Belgian general strikes
 Misère au Borinage (1933)
 André Renard
 Split of the Catholic University of Leuven
 Congo Crisis (1960-65)

References

Further reading

External links 

 Belgian general strike diary of Maurice Brinton at Libcom.org
 The Belgian General Strike by Tony Cliff at Marxist Internet Archive
 Grèves de 60: ce passé qui nous divise encore at Le Vif

General strikes in Belgium
Socialism in Belgium
History of Wallonia
Walloon movement
1960 in Belgium
1961 in Belgium
1960 labor disputes and strikes
1961 labor disputes and strikes